Kintyre may refer to:
 Kintyre, a peninsula in Scotland
 Kintyre, North Dakota, a community in the United States
 Kintyre, Jamaica, a town
 Kintyre uranium deposit, a uranium deposit in Western Australia
 Duke of Kintyre, a dukedom briefly held by Robert Bruce Stuart
 Marquess of Kintyre and Lorne, a subsidiary title of the Duke of Argyll